Quick is an unincorporated area in Frontier County, Nebraska, United States.

History
A post office called Quick was established in 1887, and remained in operation until 1945.
Quick (1887-1945) is an unincorporated place having an official federally recognized name located in Frontier County, Nebraska at latitude 40.439 and longitude -100.648. The elevation is 2,825 feet. Quick appears on the U.S. Geological Survey Map.

Historically, Quick was a community post office, operated out of a sod house owned by the landowner M. Quick. A general store operated until the 1940s at the intersection of Hwy 83 and 732 road, approximately 150 yards south of the original post office site.

References

Unincorporated communities in Frontier County, Nebraska
Unincorporated communities in Nebraska